Bartles House is a historic house located at 400 Fisher Road (formerly listed as 159 Oldwick Road) near Oldwick in Tewksbury Township, Hunterdon County, New Jersey. It was added to the National Register of Historic Places on March 14, 2007, for its significance in architecture. Described as a "vernacular cubical villa", it was built with Greek Revival style and Italianate style. The tree-lined driveway from Oldwick Road is a contributing site of the listing.

History
The Bartles family owned property in the area for farming since the 1700s. Joseph Bartles (1784–1865) built this house .

Gallery

References

External links 
 

Tewksbury Township, New Jersey
National Register of Historic Places in Hunterdon County, New Jersey
Houses on the National Register of Historic Places in New Jersey
New Jersey Register of Historic Places
Houses in Hunterdon County, New Jersey
Greek Revival houses in New Jersey
Italianate architecture in New Jersey